BC Triple Threat is a Dutch basketball club based in Haarlem. Its women's team plays in the  Women's Basketball League, the premier level of basketball in the Netherlands.

The team was founded in 2009 to offer a platform for the youth in the Schalkwijk neighbourhood. Founder Okrah Donor aimed to make the borough safer and improve its image. Four years later, in 2013, the local basketball team HOC was declared bankrupt, which paved the way for Triple Threat to start teaching basketball. In May 2020, the club announced its first women team would enter the WBL.

Notable players
 Naomi Halman

References

Basketball teams in the Netherlands
Women's basketball teams in the Netherlands
Basketball teams established in 2009
Sport in Haarlem